The following are the national records in Olympic weightlifting in Indonesia. Records are maintained in each weight class for the snatch lift, clean and jerk lift, and the total for both lifts by the All Indonesia Weightlifting Bodybuilding Powerlifting Association.

Men

Women

References

External links

Indonesia
Olympic weightlifting
records
weightlifting